Nachtfahrt is the ninth album by the German jazz rock band Kraan.

Track listing

Side one 
 "Wintruper Echo" (Hattler, Wolbrandt) – 4:30
 "Faust 2000" (Wolbrandt, Wolbrandt) – 3:56
 "Elfenbein" (Bischof, Hattler, Wolbrandt) – 5:11
 "Nachtfahrt" (Bischof, Hattler) – 6:30

Side two 
 "Playing for You" (Hattler, Wolbrandt) – 3:58
 "Viel zu heiss" (Wolbrandt, Wolbrandt) – 3:05
 "Normal" (Hattler, Wolbrandt) – 4:07
 "Paper Stars" (Hattler, Hattler) – 4:52
 "Luna Park" (Hattler, Wolbrandt) – 6:02

Personnel 
 Peter Wolbrandt – guitars, vocals
 Hellmut Hattler – bass, vocals
 Ingo Bischof – keyboards
 Gerry Brown – drums
 Jan Fride - drums on tracks 1, 5 and 6

References

External links 
 

Kraan albums
1982 albums